Bílenice is a village in Žihobce municipality in Klatovy District, Czech Republic.

Gallery 

Populated places in Klatovy District